Zlatan Stipišić (born 13 August 1968), also known as Gibonni, is a Croatian singer-songwriter and composer. He is one of the most successful and awarded recording artists from Croatia, receiving record-high 43 Porin music awards for his albums and songs.

Among his earliest solo works, "Činim pravu stvar" and "Divji cvit" are widely considered to be one of the most emotional Croatian-language songs of all time.

Career 
Born in a family with a strong musical tradition (his father, Ljubo, was a well-known composer and poet), Zlatan Stipišić who later embraced the nickname Gibonni, began his career in the 1980s with the heavy metal band Osmi putnik. After the group disbanded, Stipišić joined Divlje jagode, recording a few demo tapes before disbanding. It was Zele Lipovača, the lead guitarist of Jagode, who gave Stipišić the nickname Gibonni.

Gibonni started his solo career in the 1990s with songs that combined elements of rock, modern pop and Dalmatian folk songs. He soon created a huge following, especially among Croatian youth. Gibonni's popularity continued to grow beyond Croatia and he is currently one of the most popular and influential musicians in the territories of the former Yugoslavia. Gibonni wrote the song "Cesarica" for Oliver Dragojević which became one of Oliver's signature hit songs and one of the most popular and well-known songs in Croatia.

In 2003 Stipišić was appointed a UNICEF Goodwill Ambassador. He is involved in many humanitarian concerts and organizations fighting hunger and poverty. Gibonni released his long-awaited and critically appraised album Unca fibre in May 2006, after a five-year period following his award-winning album Mirakul. In 2010 he released the album Toleranca, and in 2013, he released 20th Century Man, sung entirely in English. This album was used partially as a fundraiser for SOS children's village. In 2016 Gibonni released the album Familija, which was made in collaboration with Oliver Dragojević, featuring 10 tracks. Soon afterwards, Gibonni released his Best of Collection consisting of his most popular songs, including some from his early 90s career.

Discography

Albums

 1991 Sa mnom ili bez mene, Croatia Records
 1993 Noina arka, Croatia Records
 1994 Kruna od perja, Croatia Records
 1995 Koncert (live album), Croatia Records
 1997 Ruža vjetrova, Croatia Records
 1999 Judi, zviri i beštimje Dallas Records
 1999 24 karata / 18 Velikih, Croatia Records
 2000 HTisdn Millennium Koncert (DVD, live album), Dallas Records
 2001 Mirakul, Dallas Records
 2003 Svi moji punti kad se zbroje (box set), Dallas Records
 2004 ZG Mirakul live (DVD, live album), Dallas Records
 2006 Unca fibre, Dallas Records
 2006 The platinum collection, Croatia Records
 2007 Acoustic:Electric (live album), Dallas Records
 2008 Acoustic:Electric special Christmas limited edition, Dallas Records
 2010 Toleranca, Dallas Records
 2013 20th Century Man, Dallas Records
 2016 Familija, Aquarius Records
 2016 Best of Collection, Croatia Records

Singles

See also
Croatian music
Zdenko Runjić
Oliver Dragojević
Zadarfest
Dalmatia

References

External links
 Gibonni
 Compositions of Gibonni
 Gibonnijevi Brodolomci
 Fan club Gibonni

1968 births
Living people
Musicians from Split, Croatia
Croatian baritones
20th-century Croatian male singers
Croatian singer-songwriters
Croatian pop singers
Croatian rock singers
Indexi Award winners
21st-century Croatian male singers